The Tampa Bay Lightning are an American professional ice hockey team based in Tampa, Florida. They play in the Atlantic Division of the Eastern Conference in the National Hockey League (NHL). Often referred to as the Bolts, the team joined the NHL in 1992 as an expansion team, and have won the Stanley Cup championship in 2004, 2020 and 2021. Having first played in the Expo Hall, and later in the ThunderDome (now known as Tropicana Field), the Lightning have played their home games at the Ice Palace, currently titled Amalie Arena, since 1996. The franchise has had seven general managers since their inception.

Key

General managers

Notes
 A running total of the number of general managers of the franchise. Thus any general manager who has two or more separate terms as general manager is only counted once. Interim general managers do not count towards the total.
 Due to the temporary realignment and interdivision play there was no conference final in the 2021 Stanley Cup playoffs. The league referred to it as the Stanley Cup Semifinals. The Prince of Wales Trophy was still awarded as it is in a traditional season.

See also
List of NHL general managers

References

Tampa Bay Lightning
General managers
Tampa Bay Lightning general managers